Dmytro "Dima" Timashov (born 1 October 1996) is a Ukrainian-born Swedish professional ice hockey forward for Brynäs IF of the Swedish Hockey League (SHL).

Playing career

Timashov made his Swedish Hockey League debut playing with Modo Hockey during the 2013–14 SHL season. Following this season, Timashov left Sweden to join the Quebec Remparts.

On 27 June 2015, during the 2015 NHL Entry Draft, Timashov was selected in the 5th round, 125th overall, by the Toronto Maple Leafs.

On 6 January 2016, Timashov was traded to the Shawinigan Cataractes. The trade came after weeks of speculation; it was previously reported Timashov would be on the move to the Moncton Wildcats, but he had refused to waive his no-movement clause to be sent to the club. The same day, rumors of a Shawinigan transaction started to appear.

Timashov joined the Toronto Maple Leafs' AHL affiliate the Toronto Marlies for the 2016–17 season and spent three years developing with the team. During the 2019–20 season, Timashov won a spot on the Maple Leafs NHL roster to start the season, and made his debut in the first game of the season against the Ottawa Senators, recording one assist. Used in a bottom-six forward role, Timashov recorded four goals and five assists in 39 games for the Maple Leafs.

On 23 February 2020, Timashov was placed on waivers by the Maple Leafs and was claimed by the Detroit Red Wings the next day. He made 5 appearances with the cellar-dwelling Red Wings, going scoreless, before the season was abruptly suspended and ended due to the COVID-19 pandemic.

As an unsigned restricted free agent with the Red Wings, on 11 December 2020, Timashov's rights were traded to the New York Islanders in exchange for future considerations. On 20 September 2021, Timashov was re-signed to a one-year contract by the Islanders.

On 20 October 2021, Timashov signed a two-year contract with Brynäs IF of the Swedish Hockey League (SHL) after mutually terminating his contract with the Islanders the previous day.

International play
Timashov was selected to represent Team Sweden at the 2016 World Junior Championships. Timashov excelled at the tournament, recording seven points in seven games played, and helping Sweden to a fourth-place finish.

Personal life
Timashov was born in Ukraine. His parents divorced when he was one year old, and at the age of seven he moved with his mother to Sollentuna, a suburb of Stockholm, in Sweden. His mother remarried there, and it was Timashov's stepfather who introduced him to hockey, buying him a pair of skates for his eighth birthday. Timashov speaks Swedish, Russian, English, and some  Ukrainian and French.

Career statistics

Regular season and playoffs

International

Awards and honours

References

External links
 

1996 births
Living people
IF Björklöven players
Bridgeport Islanders players
Bridgeport Sound Tigers players
Brynäs IF players
Detroit Red Wings players
Modo Hockey players
Mora IK players
New York Islanders players
Sportspeople from Kropyvnytskyi
Quebec Remparts players
Shawinigan Cataractes players
Swedish ice hockey left wingers
Toronto Maple Leafs draft picks
Toronto Maple Leafs players
Toronto Marlies players
Ukrainian emigrants to Sweden
Ukrainian ice hockey left wingers